Clifford J. Laube (August 28, 1891 – August 21, 1974) was an American poet, magazine, newspaper editor and publisher.

Biography

Born to a prospecting couple in Telluride, Colorado, Laube spent most of his early years in poverty in Rico, Colorado. Upon the death of his mother, Laube was placed in an orphanage where he developed his strong attachment to the Catholic faith. He managed to attain a high school education and became a newspaper man in Rico, Colorado. During a trip east, a chance encounter in Manhattan led Laube to a job at the New York Daily News. He eventually moved on to The New York Times and became their suburban editor.

In 1937, Laube founded Monastine Press, a small house dedicated to publishing the works of Catholic poets. Books published by Monastine included The Lantern Burns by Jessica Powers, Rind and All by Joseph Tusiani, The Last Garland by Theodore Maynard, and Crags by Laube himself.

Laube's writing was published in a variety of secular and religious media, including The New York Times, Commonweal Magazine, Signs, and Queen of All Hearts Magazine. He was also co-founder of the Catholic Poetry Society of America. By the time of his death in 1974, Laube had become a celebrated figure in American Catholic arts and letters, having received four honorary doctorates from Fordham University, Boston College, St. Bonaventure College, and Manhattan College.

Death
Laube died in Callicoon, New York on August 21, 1974, a week before his 83rd birthday.

References

Sources
 Clifford J. Laube, Broken Crusts: Songs of Faith and Freedom, 2007, Arx Publishing, .

External links
 Sister Miriam of the Holy Spirit (Jessica Powers)
 Jessica Powers
 Joseph Tusiani
 Theodore Maynard

1891 births
1974 deaths
Catholics from Colorado
Poets from Colorado
American male poets
American Roman Catholic poets
20th-century American poets
People from Telluride, Colorado
People from Dolores County, Colorado
20th-century American male writers
20th-century American non-fiction writers
American male non-fiction writers